The Taubman Museum of Art, formerly the Art Museum of Western Virginia, is an art museum in downtown Roanoke, Virginia, United States. It was designed by architect Randall Stout.

History
In 1947, the Roanoke chapter of the American Association of University Women requested a major exhibition from the Virginia Museum of Fine Arts, which moved part of its staff and permanent collection to The Hotel Roanoke for a period of time. In 1951, the Roanoke Fine Arts Center was incorporated as an independent organization. Between 1952 and 1954, the Roanoke Fine Arts Center used the City of Roanoke's Library to exhibit an Allen Ingles Palmer retrospective and other exhibitions. The Roanoke Fine Arts Center opened offices and studios at 715 Franklin Road in Roanoke in 1954. A year later, in 1955, the Roanoke Fine Arts Center moved into a new facility at the corner of 25th Street and Carolina Avenue in South Roanoke. The building was donated by Mr. and Mrs. J. Meade Harris.

In 1965, Anne Funkhouser Francis donated her family estate, Cherry Hill, to the Roanoke Fine Arts Center and to the Junior League. The first exhibition at Cherry Hill was of works by Thomas Eakins, borrowed from his Roanoke relatives. From 1965 to 1976, the Roanoke Fine Arts Center exhibited the works of regional artists, as well as works by such nationally recognized figures as Andy Warhol and Edward Steichen. A permanent collection began to develop with gifts of art from local collectors and the City of Roanoke. In 1976, the Roanoke Fine Arts Center received full accreditation from the American Association of Museums and celebrated its 25th anniversary.

In 1983, renamed the Roanoke Museum of Fine Arts, the museum relocated to Center in the Square on Market Square in downtown Roanoke. The new location, larger in size and with more gallery space for the permanent collection, opened the museum to new and broader audiences from across the region. In 2001 the museum received the long-promised Peggy Macdowell Thomas bequest, which included 27 works associated with major American artist Thomas Eakins and his circle and funds to support a named gallery; in 2007 Mrs. Thomas’ house and its contents also came to the museum, providing further artwork and financial support.

In 2002, the Art Museum announced that Randall Stout had been selected as design architect for the Art Museum's new facility. On March 21, 2005, the Art Museum unveiled the design for its new 81,000 square foot state-of-the-art facility in downtown Roanoke. Construction of the new facility began in May 2006. On February 6, 2008, the Board of Trustees of the institution announced that the new building was to be named in honor of the former CEO of Advance Auto Parts and later the U.S. Ambassador to Romania, Nicholas F. Taubman, and Mrs. Eugenia L. Taubman in recognition of their lead gift to the capital campaign. Museum staff moved into the Taubman Museum of Art on September 8, 2008. The Taubman Museum of Art opened to the public on November 8, 2008.

The Fralin Center for American Art consists of ten galleries that house special exhibitions as well as its renowned permanent collection. The center is named in honor of Horace G. and Ann H. Fralin. The City of Roanoke Atrium is a 1,600 square feet space used for large installations. The museum maintains three galleries devoted to the display and discussion of works from the permanent collection. The galleries change their content to ensure that a broad and diverse array of artwork created by internationally respected artists is continually accessible to the public, with 15–20 rotations per year. Art Venture, adjacent to the atrium, is a 2,436 square foot interactive gallery space that contains 13 discovery centers for children and families.

Collection and exhibitions
The permanent collection of more than 2,000 works of art includes prominent 19th- and early 20th-century American art, as well as significant modern and contemporary art, photography, design, and decorative arts, and several smaller collections including Southern folk art. The American art collection dates from the mid-19th through the second quarter of the 20th century, providing exemplary works from the Hudson River, American Realism, American Impressionism, and Arts and Crafts art movements; works by self-taught artists are a small but important subsection to this collection. American artists include Thomas Eakins, Winslow Homer, Childe Hassam, Maurice Prendergast, John Singer Sargent, Robert Henri, Norman Rockwell, George Inness, Eduard Steichen, and Thomas Hart Benton. The modern and contemporary collection includes works by Jasper Johns, Robert Rauschenberg, Jacob Lawrence, Romare Bearden, John Cage, Audrey Flack, and Dorothy Gillespie.

Gallery

References

External links

 Taubman Museum of Art official website

1951 establishments in Virginia
Art museums established in 1951
Museums in Roanoke, Virginia
Art museums and galleries in Virginia
Institutions accredited by the American Alliance of Museums
Museums of American art
Postmodern architecture in the United States